Mireille Cayre (2 April 1947 – 16 November 2019) was a French gymnast. She competed at the 1968 Summer Olympics and the 1972 Summer Olympics.

References

External links
 

1947 births
2019 deaths
French female artistic gymnasts
Olympic gymnasts of France
Gymnasts at the 1968 Summer Olympics
Gymnasts at the 1972 Summer Olympics
Sportspeople from Moulins, Allier
20th-century French women